Money is an American personal finance brand and website owned by Ad Practitioners LLC and formerly also a monthly magazine, first published by Time Inc. (1972–2018) and later by Meredith Corporation (2018–2019). Its articles cover the gamut of personal finance topics ranging from credit cards, mortgages, insurance, banking and investing to family finance issues like paying for college, credit, career and home improvement. It is well known for its annual list of "America's Best Places to Live".

, the website draws more than 10 million unique visitors per month.

History
The first issue of Money magazine was published in October 1972 by Time Inc.

The magazine, along with Fortune, was a partner with sister cable network CNN in CNNMoney.com, an arrangement made after the discontinuation of the CNNfn business news channel in 2005. In 2014, following the spin-off of Time Inc. from its and CNN's parent Time Warner, Money launched its own website, Money.com.

The magazine was put up for sale after Meredith Corporation completed its acquisition of Time Inc. at the beginning of 2018. After failing to find a buyer, Meredith in April 2019 announced that it would cease Moneys print publication, but would invest in the brand's digital component, Money.com. Money published its last print issue in June 2019. The printed magazine's remaining 400,000 or so subscribers were transferred to Kiplinger's Personal Finance magazine.

In October 2019, Meredith Corporation sold the Money brand and website to Ad Practitioners LLC, a media and advertising company based in Puerto Rico that runs the product review website ConsumersAdvocate.org. Terms for the deal were not disclosed. Ad Practitioners LLC does not have plans to relaunch a print version of Money.

References

External links

1972 establishments in New York City
2019 disestablishments in New York (state)
Business magazines published in the United States
Magazines disestablished in 2019
Magazines established in 1972
Magazines formerly owned by Meredith Corporation
Magazines published in New York City
Monthly magazines published in the United States
Online magazines with defunct print editions
Online magazines published in the United States